La Chapelle-Bouëxic is a commune in the Ille-et-Vilaine department in Brittany in northwestern France.

It is located southwest of Rennes between Pont-Péan and Guer.

Population
Inhabitants of La Chapelle-Bouëxic are called Chapellois in French.

See also
Communes of the Ille-et-Vilaine department

References

External links

  Cultural Heritage

Communes of Ille-et-Vilaine